The Breachacha crannog is a crannog located near Loch Breachacha, on the Inner Hebridean island of Coll. The crannog is recognised in the United Kingdom as a Scheduled monument. A scheduled monument is a 'nationally important' archaeological site or historic building, given legal protection against unauthorised change. There are about 8,000 such sites in Scotland.

Description

It sits within the former loch which was known as Poll nam Broig. The loch was drained in 1875 and today the crannog sits in an arable field. The surrounding ground is marshy and can be accessed only from the east.

The crannog is oval-shaped and consists of a stone and earth mound with a flattened top.

Holley surveyed the site in 1995 and noted a series of five, semicircular pits dug into the ground on the east, south, and south-west sides of the crannog. He considered these holes to have been dug relatively recently, since the early 20th century antiquary Erskine Beveridge made no mention of them, nor did he mention any form of excavation on site. There is no trace of a causeway, jetty, or harbour on the site. There is no trace of any walling at the site; or of any protruding timbers. Holley noted that the stones appear to be of local origin. There are no other man-made features near the site.

References

Archaeological sites in the Northern Inner Hebrides
Coll
Crannogs in Scotland
Former populated places in Scotland
Fortifications in Scotland
Scheduled monuments in Scotland